The 2021–22 Charlton Athletic season was the club's 116th season in their existence, after having been founded in 1905, and their second back in League One following relegation from the Championship in 2020. Along with competing in League One, the club also participated in the FA Cup, EFL Cup and the EFL Trophy. The season covered the period from 1 July 2021 to 30 June 2022.

Squad statistics

|}

Top scorers

Disciplinary record

Transfers

Transfers in

Transfers out

Loans in

Loans out

Friendlies
On 25 May 2021, Charlton Athletic announced its first confirmed friendlies taking place ahead of the 2021/22 season would be against Celtic at Celtic Manor Resort in Newport in a behind-closed-doors fixture, and against Dartford at Princes Park in Dartford. On 8 June 2021, Charlton Athletic confirmed a third friendly against Reading in a behind-closed-doors fixture. On 11 June a fourth friendly was announced against Crystal Palace taking place at Selhurst Park. A fifth friendly was added on 8 July which would see Charlton travel to Craven Cottage to face Fulham. Also on 8 July, a sixth friendly was added against Welling United at Park View Road.

Competitions

League One

League table

Result summary

Results by round

Matches
The 2021–22 season fixtures were released on Thursday 24 June 2021.

FA Cup

The first round draw was made on Sunday 17 October 2021. The second round draw was made on Monday 8 November 2021. The third round draw was made on Monday 6 December 2021.

EFL Cup

The first round draw was made on Thursday 24 June 2021 on Sky Sports by Andy Cole and Danny Mills.

EFL Trophy

The regional group stage draw was confirmed on Thursday 24 June 2021 by Anton Ferdinand. The group stage dates were announced on Wednesday 14 July 2021. The second round draw was made on Saturday 13 November 2021. The third round draw was made on Saturday 4 December 2021 by Kevin Phillips and Jay Bothroyd. The quarter-finals draw was made on Thursday 6 January 2022.

London Senior Cup 

Charlton were drawn against Erith & Belvedere for the First Round of the London Senior Cup.

References

Notes

Charlton Athletic
Charlton Athletic F.C. seasons
Charlton
Charlton
English football clubs 2021–22 season